Anamaria Gorea (born 4 January 1993) is a Romanian footballer who plays as a defender. She has been a member of the Romania women's national team.

References

External links

1993 births
Living people
Romanian women's footballers
Women's association football defenders
Romania women's international footballers
FCU Olimpia Cluj players